Roland Baier (born August 11, 1954) is a Swiss chess problemist. In 1983 Baier won the first individual World Chess Solving Championship. In 1988 he gained the title International Solving Grandmaster. In 1989 he awarded the FIDE title - International Arbiter of Chess Composition, but in 1992 he became FIDE Master of Chess Composition.

References

External links
 Problems at the PDB-Server

1954 births
Living people
Swiss chess players
International Judges of Chess Compositions
Chess composers
International solving grandmasters
Chess arbiters